Euphaedra crossei, or Crosse's forester, is a butterfly in the family Nymphalidae. It is found in Ghana and Nigeria. The habitat consists of forests at the forest-Guinea savanna boundary.

Description
Very close to Euphaedra xypete qv.

Subspecies
Euphaedra crossei crossei (eastern Nigeria)
Euphaedra crossei akani Hecq & Joly, 2004 (northern Ghana)

References

Butterflies described in 1902
crossei